Mateusz Szczepaniak (born 10 February 1987 in Poland) is an international speedway rider who has won the Team Under 21 World Championship with the Poland speedway team.

Career
In 2022, he helped Wilki Krosno win the 2022 1.Liga. The following season he signed for GKM Grudziądz for the 2023 Polish speedway season.

Family
His elder brother Michał is also a speedway rider.

Honours 
 Individual U-21 World Championship
 2008 - 10th place in Semi-Final 1 (7 points)
 Team U-21 World Championship
 2007 - World Champion (9 points)
 Individual U-19 European Championship
 2006 - 11th place (6 points)
 European Club Champions' Cup
 2004 - European Champion (track reserve)
 Individual U-21 Polish Championship
 2008 - Rybnik - 9th place (7 points)
 Team Polish Championship
 2004 - 3rd place
 2005 - 3rd place
 2006 - 2nd place
 2007 - 5th place - CMA 5.57 (details)
 Team U-21 Polish Championship
 2008 -  Leszno - Bronze medal (11 points)
 Polish Silver Helmet (U-21)
 2008 -  Rzeszów - 4th place (11+N points)
 Bronze Helmet (U-19)
 2006 - Winner

See also 
 Poland national speedway team
 Speedway in Poland

References

External links 
(pl) Włókniarz Częstochowa Squad

1987 births
Living people
Polish speedway riders
Team Speedway Junior World Champions
People from Ostrów Wielkopolski
Place of birth missing (living people)
Sportspeople from Greater Poland Voivodeship